The Raymond A. Mason School of Business is the business school at William & Mary in Virginia. The school, named after alumnus and founder of Legg Mason, Raymond A. "Chip" Mason, in 2005,   The school offers Full-time MBA, Part-time MBA, Executive MBA, Masters in Accounting, Master of Science in Business Analytics and Undergraduate Business Degrees.

History

In 1919, William & Mary President Julian A.C. Chandler established the Department of Business while expanding the University's sphere of services. The study of business grew in popularity over the 20th Century, with substantial growth after the end of World War II.

The University established the Master of Business Administration (MBA) Program in 1966. In 1968 the Department of Business became the School of Business, and in 1971, the College's Board of Visitors approved the addition of the Bachelor of Business Administration (BBA) undergraduate degree. 
The Mason School of Business is an AACSB-accredited school of business.

Graduate programs

Full-time MBA
The full-time MBA program, a 22-month program offering instruction in entrepreneurship, finance, general management, marketing, information technology and operations management. The program hosts a distinguished speaker series, organizes visits to various corporations, and facilitates internal and external case competitions, as well as cultural festivities, philanthropy and sustainability initiatives.

The Raymond A. Mason School of Business ranked #47 (tied) in the 2023 edition of the U.S. News rankings. In the same year, Mason's MBA program was ranked #41 by Bloomberg Businessweek In 2019, Mason's MBA program was ranked #44 by Forbes. In 2021-2022, Mason's MBA program was ranked #52 by Poets & Quants.

Online MBA

Flex MBA
For the working professional, the school's Executive and Professional Programs (EPP) provides graduate business and continuing business education (non-degree) in a variety of formats:

The Flex MBA, established in 1985, is located at the Peninsula Center in the Oyster Point area of Newport News; the Executive MBA program, established in 1986, is a 20-month program for executives with classes on every two weeks on Friday and Saturday.

Masters in Accounting
The Master's in Accounting program (MAcc), is a one-year program that provides the necessary credit hours and curricular requirements to be eligible to sit for the CPA exam.

 The site bases its rankings on recent graduate's success in landing desirable accounting jobs.

Master of Science in Business Analytics
The MS in Business Analytics is a new 1-year, accelerated program.

Undergraduate
The Bachelor's in Business Administration program (BBA) is a two-year program within William & Mary that provides undergraduate business education in five majors: Accounting, Finance, Marketing, and Business Analytics. Students who major in Business are also eligible to concentrate (mini-major) in any of the major fields, plus Entrepreneurship and Consulting. It additionally provides minors in the above-mentioned majors and Management.

Campus
The business school is housed on the main campus of William and Mary in Williamsburg. The Mason School of Business moved into its new building, Alan B. Miller Hall, in fall 2009. Miller Hall was named for William & Mary alumnus, Alan B. Miller. It is located at the Corner of Ukrop Way and Jamestown Road at the western edge of campus. The building was designed by Robert A.M. Stern Architects in the Georgian style.

Notable alumni

See also
 List of United States business school rankings
 List of business schools in the United States

References

College of William & Mary schools and programs
Educational institutions established in 1919
Business schools in Virginia
1919 establishments in Virginia
Robert A. M. Stern buildings